The grey-throated sunbird (Anthreptes griseigularis) is a species of bird in the family Nectariniidae. It is found in a wide range of semi-open wooded habitats in the northern and eastern part of the Philippines. It is often considered a subspecies of the brown-throated sunbird, but the two differ consistently in measurements and plumage, and there is no evidence of intergradation between them.

References

grey-throated sunbird
Endemic birds of the Philippines
grey-throated sunbird